Ameles gracilis is a species of praying mantis found on the Canary Islands.

References

gracilis
Insects described in 1840
Fauna of the Canary Islands
Taxa named by Gaspard Auguste Brullé